Cagayan's 3rd congressional district is one of the three congressional districts of the Philippines in the province of Cagayan. It has been represented in the House of Representatives of the Philippines since 1987. The district consists of the provincial capital city of Tuguegarao, and adjacent municipalities of Amulung, Enrile, Iguig, Peñablanca, Solana, and Tuao. It is currently represented in the 18th Congress by Joseph L. Lara of the PDP–Laban.

Representation history

Election results

2016

2013

2010

See also 

 Legislative districts of Cagayan

References 

Congressional districts of the Philippines
Politics of Cagayan
1987 establishments in the Philippines
Congressional districts of Cagayan Valley
Constituencies established in 1987